The Ministry on the Status and Rights of Women in Haiti, in French Ministère à la Condition féminine et aux Droits des femmes, abbreviated as MCFDF, is a ministry in Haiti, founded on 8 November 1994 with the mission to work for the emergence of an egalitarian society with equality between men and women.

History 
MCFDF is a result of demands from Haitian women, and was created as part of the preparatory work for the World Conference on Women, 1995. It was created by decree on 8 November 1994 and gave itself two functions in 2004: to defend and promote the rights of women and to promote gender analyses.

Lise Marie Déjean, one of the co-founders of Solidarite Fanm Ayisyèn, worked for the creation of the ministry, and was also named the first minister. The current minister is Evelyne Sainvil.

Structures 
MCFDF consists of two structures:

Central services 

 The Secretariat of the minister
 The Cabinet of the minister
 The General Directorate
 The Management

Decentralized services 
Each geographic department of the country, according to the decree, has a departmental management working to coordinate the regional services of the ministry.

Sources 

Women's ministries
Women in Haiti
Government ministries of Haiti
Women's rights in Haiti